Ron McLeod (4 January 1919 – 9 October 2003) was  a former Australian rules footballer who played with North Melbourne and St Kilda in the Victorian Football League (VFL).

Notes

References

External links 
		

1919 births
2003 deaths
Australian rules footballers from Victoria (Australia)
Australian Rules footballers: place kick exponents
North Melbourne Football Club players
St Kilda Football Club players